Sparks is the third full-length studio album by rock band Fiction Plane. It was released in continental Europe (excluding the UK) on 10 May 2010 via Roadrunner Records. 
Two versions of the album exist: a standard 11-song version, and a deluxe digipack edition featuring 14 songs. The album artwork was once again provided by Alex Lake, who previously contributed the art for Bitter Forces and Lame Race Horses, Left Side of the Brain, and Paradiso. Sparks was only available in stores in continental Europe and at European online retailers.

Sparks was recorded at RAK Studios in London (in February/March 2009) and at Moles Studios in Bath, England (in September 2009). It was mixed and engineered by Paul Corkett. The bonus track "Sadr City Blues (acoustic)" was recorded at Airtime Studios in Bloomington, Indiana. The album's first single, "Push Me Around", was released in Europe on 4 April 2010. A video for the track was also filmed, but has not yet premiered.

The lead track "You Know You're Good (La La La Song)" is a reworking of the song "Cut Your Brakes". The band wrote the song during The Police 30th Anniversary Tour (2007) and it evolved over time to its current incarnation. The only released recording of "Cut Your Breaks" appeared on Fiction Plane's live album Paradiso. "Russian LSD" is based on the 1966 Russian novel The Master and Margarita, by Mikhail Bulgakov. The novel tells the story about what happens when the Devil pays a visit to a Soviet Union that is largely composed of atheists. "Humanoid" was inspired by the short story "The Secret Life of Walter Mitty", by James Thurber. "Sadr City Blues (acoustic)" was recorded in August 2008 and was  intended to be on an acoustic EP the band hoped to release that Christmas. However, due to legal issues and problems with the previous record label, the EP was never released.

Track listing

Personnel
Fiction Plane
 Joe Sumner – vocals, bass
 Seton Daunt – guitar
 Pete Wilhoit – drums

Technical personnel
 Fiction Plane – production
 Paul Corkett – engineering, mixing
 Paul Lamalfa – engineering
 Donal Hodgson – vocal engineering
 Helen Atkinson – assistant, Pro-Tools
 Nick Jopling – assistant, Pro-Tools
 Robbie Nelson – assistant, Pro-Tools
 Brian "Big Bass" Gardner – mastering
 Daniel Regan – management

Charts

References

 

2010 albums
Fiction Plane albums
Roadrunner Records albums